Rwanda pour mémoire is a 2003 documentary film about the Rwandan genocide.

Synopsis 
In 1994, between April and July, the massacre of Tutsis and moderate Hutus left one million dead. Instigated by Fest’Africa, a dozen African authors met four years after the events as writers in residence at Kigali, to try to break the silence of African intellectuals on this genocide.

In May 2000, on the occasion of the publication of series of works based on this experience, writers and artists from Africa and elsewhere gathered in Rwanda. Facing up to the scars left by the genocide, Samba Felix N’Diaye manages to find just the right sense of distance to film the inexpressible while nevertheless communicating a message of hope.

Writers in the film include Boubacar Boris Diop, Véronique Tadjo, Benjamin Sehene, Nocky Djedanoum, Koulsy Lamko and Yves Simon, who all participated in a writer in residence program organized in Rwanda in May 2000 by the Fest'Africa literature festival based in Lille, France.

References 

2003 films
French documentary films
Senegalese documentary films
2003 documentary films
Documentary films about the Rwandan genocide
Documentary films about writers
Films set in Rwanda
2000s French-language films
2000s French films